Núñez i Navarro Hotels, also known as nnhotels, is a Spanish-based hotel chain with nine properties in Barcelona. 
Most of them rank on Top 20 in Barcelona by Tripadvisor.com users. 
The company is part of Grup Núñez i Navarro.

Properties 
Barcelona
 B-Hotel
 Hotel 1898
 Hotel Barcelona Universal
 Hotel Europark
 Hotel Granvia
 Hotel Jazz
 Hotel Paral·lel
 Hotel Soho Barcelona
 Hotel U232 (formerly known as Hotel Núñez-Urgell)

External links 
Núñez i Navarro Hotels
Hotel 1898
Hotel Jazz
B-Hotel

Hotel chains in Spain